Beaumais is a commune in the Calvados department in the Normandy region in northwestern France. Its Church of the Nativity dates from the 11th century, and chateau dates from the 16th century.

Population

See also
Communes of the Calvados department

References

Communes of Calvados (department)
Calvados communes articles needing translation from French Wikipedia